Bourillon may refer to:

 Grégory Bourillon (born 1984), French soccer player
 Nathalie Bourillon (born 1965), French ski mountaineer